Oswald O'Neil Skippings (born 19 February 1953) is a Turks and Caicos Islander politician who served as the 2nd Chief Minister of the Turks and Caicos Islands from 19 June 1980 to 4 November 1980 and again from 3 March 1988 to 3 April 1991.

Skippings became the youngest member of a Caribbean government ever when he was first elected to the Turks and Caicos Islands (TCI) legislature in 1976 at the age of 22.  He later became the youngest leader of a Caribbean government ever when he became Chief Minister in 1980 at the age of 26. Skippings was Chief Minister of the Turks and Caicos Islands between June and November 1980 and again between March 1988 and April 1991. In July 2012, he was re-elected leader of the People's Democratic Movement.

References

|-

1953 births
Chief Ministers of the Turks and Caicos Islands
Living people
People's Democratic Movement (Turks and Caicos Islands) politicians